Achaea retrorsa is a species of moth of the family Erebidae first described by George Hampson in 1913. It is found on Madagascar.

References

Achaea (moth)
Moths of Madagascar
Erebid moths of Africa
Moths described in 1913